Robert Smith (27 May 1868 – 21 August 1927) was an Australian cricketer. He played one first-class cricket match for Victoria in 1890.

See also
 List of Victoria first-class cricketers

References

External links
 

1868 births
1927 deaths
Australian cricketers
Victoria cricketers